Van Buren is an unincorporated community in west-central Hardeman County, Tennessee, United States. it shares a ZIP code 38042 with Hickory Valley. Van Buren's exact location is at the intersection of Van Buren Road and Lake Hardeman Road in Hardeman County.

References

Unincorporated communities in Hardeman County, Tennessee
Unincorporated communities in Tennessee